Gråhøe or Gråhøi is a mountain in Lom Municipality in Innlandet county, Norway. The mountain is surrounded by several other notable mountains including Finnshalspiggen to the north; Smådalshøe and Nørdre Trollsteinhøe to the east; Grotbreahesten to the southeast; Svartholshøe, Trollsteinrundhøe, Trollsteineggi, and Glittertinden to the south; and Lauvhøe to the northwest.

See also
List of mountains of Norway

References

Lom, Norway
Jotunheimen
Mountains of Innlandet